Jack O'Connor (born 23 October 1960) is an Irish Gaelic football manager and former player. In 2021, he was appointed manager of the senior Kerry county team, having earlier managed it over two terms in the 2000s.

O'Connor played football with his local club Dromid Pearses from the 1970s until the early 2000s. As manager, he guided Kerry to four All-Ireland SFC titles: in 2004, 2006, 2009 and 2022, during three terms as manager.

Biography 
Born in 1960 at Toorsaleen in Mastergeehy County Kerry. The youngest of nine children born to Michael and Síle O'Connor, he was educated locally at Caslagh national school before later attending Scoil Uí Chonaill in Cahersiveen. It was here that O'Connor's football skills were developed and he was picked for the Kerry vocational schools team in 1977 and 1978. Defeats of Kildare and Mayo respectively gave O'Connor back-to-back All-Ireland winners' medals in this competition.

After completing his secondary education O'Connor moved on to Maynooth College where he obtained a B.A, H.dip Ed in Spanish and Irish.  His first teaching job was at Waterville Tech. He progressed from there to his alma mater, Scoil Ui Chonaill, where he remained on the teaching staff until 1999. Here O'Connor became involved in training the school's football team and he enjoyed much success as a coach.  In 1997 he guided Scoil Uí Chonaill to the Kerry county title in the vocational schools championship. A Munster title quickly followed before an All-Ireland final showdown with St. Malachy's from Castlewellan. O'Connor's side were victorious on that occasion.

He managed Kerry County Vocational Schools Teams to All-Ireland wins in 1992 and 93.

The amalgamation of the three schools in Cahersiveen in 1999 led to the creation of Coláiste na Sceilge. O'Connor remained on the teaching staff while also holding on to his position as coach of the school's football team. In 1999 he guided the school to another set of county and provincial vocational titles while another All-Ireland final appearance beckoned. Holy Trinity College provided the opposition on that occasion, however, victory went to the Kerry team. In 2000 Coláiste na Sceilge made history when they retained their county, Munster and All-Ireland vocational titles.

Further success followed for O'Connor's youngsters in the early 2000s. Coláiste na Sceilge won three consecutive Corn Uí Mhuirí titles in 2001, 2002 and 2003, however, the team fell in the subsequent All-Ireland semi-final on all three occasions. After a prolonged absence O'Connor guided his school team to a fourth Corn Uí Mhuirí title in 2009. At the fourth attempt Coláiste na Sceilge reached the All-Ireland final. St Mary's of Edenderry provided the opposition, however, the Kerry youngsters were too strong and won the game by 1–9 to 0–10. It was a first Hogan Cup title for Coláiste na Sceilge.

O'Connor is married to Bridie (née Moriarty) and has two sons – Cian (born 1989) and Éanna (born 1992). The latter was a member of the Kerry minor football team in 2009. In March 2007, he published his autobiography, Keys to the Kingdom.

Playing career

Club 
O'Connor played his club football with Dromid Pearses and has enjoyed some success. As a player and a coach with the club for over twenty years he helped them progress through the ranks in Kerry football from Division 5 to Division 1.

In 1981 he was a member of the South Kerry team that reached the final of the county senior championship. On that occasion the divisional side accounted for the famed Austin Stacks club. O'Connor collected a county winners' medal as a non-playing substitute.

In 1982 O'Connor was still confined to the substitutes' bench as South Kerry contested a second consecutive county final.  Feale Rangers, a division from the northern part of the county, provided the opposition.  O'Connor's side were far too strong and recorded back-to-back county titles.

Three-in-a-row proved beyond O'Connor's divisional side, however, South Kerry were back in the county championship decider again in 1984 with O'Connor making it onto the starting fifteen. A Páidí Ó Sé-trained West Kerry team defeated the men from the south on that occasion.

In 1999 O'Connor captured a county novice championship title with Dromid Pearses.

Managerial career

Kerry (first term) 
Jack, a Dromid Pearses man, has won the All-Ireland with Kerry on three occasions, in 2004 and 2006 and 2009. Both of his first two win in the All-Ireland wins were against Mayo. Kerry also won the National Football League in all three of those years. O'Connor considered resigning after Kerry's 2006 victory, although county board chairman Seán Walsh wanted him to stay on. O'Connor finally stepped down, along with his backroom staff (selectors Ger O'Keeffe and Johnny Culloty and trainer Pat Flanagan) on 16 October 2006. His final decision to step down as the manager was said to be for personal reasons. Kerry's county chairman Seán Walsh was disappointed by the final decision but made a point of acknowledging O'Connor's successes as manager. Few managers have achieved his successes in such a short period of time; two all-Irelands, two Munster Championships and two National League Division One titles. O'Connor was the first Kerry manager to take Kerry to three All-Ireland finals since Mick O'Dwyer.

Kerins O'Rahillys 
After taking a break from management for a year he took over Tralee club side Kerins O'Rahilly's in 2008 whom he led to the Munster Club Championship Final but lost out to Nemo Rangers of Cork. He also led them to the Kerry County Final against Mid Kerry, losing in the replay.

Kerry (second term) 
After Pat O'Shea's resignation as Kerry Manager he was confirmed as manager for the 2009 campaign. On 26 April 2009, he managed Kerry to win the Allianz NFL Division 1 title, beating Derry 1–15 to 0–15 in the final at Croke Park.

On 20 September 2009, he managed Kerry to win their 36th All-Ireland Senior Football title with a four-point win over Cork in Croke Park.
Despite being written off by many of the games experts O'Connor's men proved their worth first with a stunning quarter-final victory over Dublin and from that point on never looked back and went on to beat Meath in the semi-final before claiming the title against Cork. O'Connor said 'There is a lot of satisfaction in this, we were being written off by many experts".
On 30 August 2010, O'Connor reappointment as manager was ratified by the Kerry county committee in Tralee, which agreed to a new three-year term for the management team.

On 11 August 2012, O'Connor stepped down as Kerry manager for the second time despite pressure from the County Board for him to stay.

Kerry minors 
On 31 August 2013, O'Connor was appointed as Kerry minor manager taking over from Mickey Ned O'Sullivan on a two-year term. O'Connor led Kerry to a second consecutive Munster championship in 2014, beating near rivals Cork in the final. They went on to win the All-Ireland in 2014, Kerry's first victory in the competition in 20 years, beating Donegal 0-17 to 1-10 in the final, matching their senior counterparts victory in the senior final. O'Connor's charges repeated the success in 2015, comprehensively beating Munster rivals Tipperary in both the Munster final and the All-Ireland Final, winning 2-14 to 1-11 and 4-14 to 0-6 respectively.

Kerry under-21s 
In 2016, O'Connor was appointed manager of the under-21 football team.

He left to manage the Kildare senior team in 2019.

Kildare

Kerry (third term) 
Jack was ratified by the Kerry County Board on 4 October 2021 to take charge of the Kerry Senior Team for the third time on a two-year term. He successfully led Kerry to an All-Ireland Final victory in 2022.

Honours 
Inter-county
All-Ireland Senior Football Championship:
Winner (4): 2004, 2006, 2009, 2022
Runner-up (2): 2005, 2011
All-Ireland Under 21 Football Championship:
Winner (1): 1998
Runner-up (1): 1999
All-Ireland Minor Football Championship:
Winner (2): 2014, 2015
Munster Senior Football Championship:
Winner (5): 2004, 2005, 2010, 2011, 2022
Munster Under-21 Football Championship:
Winner (3): 1998, 1999, 2017
Munster Under-20 Football Championship:
Winner (1): 2018
Munster Minor Football Championship:
Winner (2): 2014, 2015
National Football League:
Winner (4): 2004, 2006, 2009, 2022

Schools
 All-Ireland Vocational Schools Championship 3: 1997, 1999, 2000
 All Ireland Colleges Hogan Cup 1: 2009
 Munster Vocational Schools Championship 3: 1997, 1999, 2000
 Kerry Vocational Schools Championship 3: 1997, 1999, 2000
 Munster Colleges A Championship 4: 2001, 2002, 2003, 2009

References 

1960 births
Living people
Alumni of St Patrick's College, Maynooth
Dromid Pearses Gaelic footballers
Gaelic football managers
Gaelic football selectors
Irish schoolteachers
Kerry Gaelic footballers